The  Baltimore Colts season was the 12th season for the team in the National Football League. The Colts finished the regular season with a record of 12 wins and 2 losses and finished first in the Western Conference. It was their first conference title since 1959, clinched on November 22 with three games remaining.

After an opening loss at Minnesota, the Colts won eleven straight, dropped a home game in December to Detroit, then easily won the finale with Washington.

Baltimore met the Cleveland Browns (10–3–1) of the Eastern Conference in the NFL Championship Game in Cleveland, won by the underdog Browns, 27–0.

Personnel

Staff/coaches

Roster

Regular season

Schedule 

Note: ^ The game with the Cardinals in week 5 was scheduled to be played at St. Louis, but was shifted to Baltimore when the baseball Cardinals reached the World Series, preempting football use of Busch Stadium during the Series.

Season summary

Week 1 at Vikings

Week 2 at Packers

Standings

Postseason 

After Baltimore's 12–2 regular season, they traveled to Cleveland to take on the Browns (10–3–1) for the NFL title on December 27. The host team was alternated between the conferences, Eastern in even-numbered seasons and Western in the odd-numbered. This was the third championship game appearance for the Colts since joining the NFL in 1953, and they entered the game as seven-point favorites. Both teams had two weeks to prepare: the first half was uneventful and scoreless, but the home underdog Browns scored seventeen points in the third quarter in their 27–0 rout of the Colts.

1964 NFL Championship Game: at Cleveland Browns

Awards and honors 
 Johnny Unitas, Bert Bell Award

See also 
 History of the Indianapolis Colts
 Indianapolis Colts seasons
 Colts-Patriots rivalry

References 

Baltimore Colts
1964
Baltimore Colts